David James Southwick (born 31 March 1968) is a Australian Liberal politician, and has been the member for Caulfield in the Victorian Legislative Assembly since 2010. Southwick has been the Parliamentary Secretary for Police and Emergency Services and is currently Shadow Minister for Jobs and Employment, Shadow Minister for Events Industry, Shadow Minister for Business Recovery, Shadow Minister for CBD Recovery, Shadow Minister for Small Business and Shadow Minister for Business Precincts. As of 7 September 2021, Southwick is the Deputy Leader of the Liberal Party in Victoria.

Early life
Southwick was born and raised in his electorate of Caulfield and has lived there most of his life.

He completed his high school certificate at Mount Scopus Memorial College and studied a Bachelor of Business at Victoria University, later going on to do postgraduate study at the Monash University Caulfield campus.

Business career
While at university Southwick started his business career including being founding and serving as managing director of The Body Collection.  In this business, he employed 50 staff.

Southwick also worked as a lecturer at both Victoria University and RMIT. He served as RMIT's first Entrepreneur in Residence in 2003.

He has previously the Chair of the Ardoch Youth Foundation.

Political career
Southwick was the Liberal candidate for the Division of Melbourne Ports in the 2004 federal election, achieving a swing of almost 2 points against the incumbent MP Michael Danby. In the 2006 state election he was a Liberal candidate for the Southern Metropolitan Region.

Southwick was elected as the member for Caulfield in 2010.

In November 2012, it was revealed that Southwick had misleading personal information on his website. He claimed to have been an 'Adjunct Professor' at RMIT, and that he had a graduate diploma in marketing from Monash University, despite being several units short. Both universities stated that Southwick had never obtained the qualifications referred to. The information was subsequently removed from his website. Southwick responded to the claims by saying that 'Adjunct Professor' was a title used to refer to him while undertaking teaching overseas on behalf of the RMIT Graduate School of Business in Hong Kong, when he was an Adjunct Lecturer.

In April 2013, he was appointed Parliamentary Secretary for Police and Emergency Services.

In December 2014, he was appointed Shadow Minister for Energy and Resources, Shadow Minister for Renewables, and Shadow Minister for Innovation.

In December 2018, he was appointed Shadow Minister for Police; Community Safety; and Corrections with his portfolio expanding to include Shadow Minister for Crime Prevention and Youth Justice in March 2021.

In September 2021, Southwick was elected as deputy leader of the state Liberal Party.

Policy positions 
In a 2015 conscience vote, Southwick was one of just 13 lower house MPs to vote against the creation of safe access zones outside abortion clinics. He was praised for this decision by the anti-abortion group Right to Life Australia

In a 2018 conscience vote, Southwick voted against the legalisation of voluntary assisted dying.
	
During the 2018 Victorian state election, Southwick opposed the Safe Schools anti-bullying program, claiming “really young children [are] being exposed to sexual education”. In 2019, Southwick voted against a bill that would allow transgender people to change their gender on their birth certificate.

In 2020, Southwick was critical of the Victorian Department of Education for antisemitic and anti-Israeli bullying in a Melbourne school, accusing the Department of “systemic failings”.

Southwick has also criticised the government for its response to the COVID-19 pandemic, claiming that mismanagement of hotel quarantine caused the death of 800 Victorians.

On 10 November 2022, during the 2022 Victorian state election campaign, Southwick was caught using two campaign staffers in campaign ads without disclosing they are his paid employees. Opposition leader Matthew Guy endorsed the dishonest advertising, downplaying the use of paid staffers in the ads by endorsing Southwick and stating that "it was not misleading", regardless of the lack of a disclaimer.

References

External links
 Parliamentary voting record of David Southwick at Victorian Parliament Tracker
 

1968 births
Living people
Politicians from Melbourne
Members of the Victorian Legislative Assembly
Monash University alumni
Liberal Party of Australia members of the Parliament of Victoria
Victoria University, Melbourne alumni
People who fabricated academic degrees
Jewish Australian politicians
21st-century Australian politicians
People from Caulfield, Victoria